King Charles III of the United Kingdom and other Commonwealth Realms has been depicted in art and popular culture.

Film
Charles has been portrayed on screen by:
Alex Jennings in The Queen (2006)
Jack Farthing in Spencer (2021)

Television
Charles has been portrayed in television films and series by:

David Robb in Charles & Diana: A Royal Love Story (1982)
Christopher Baines in The Royal Romance of Charles and Diana (1982)
Adam Bareham in Fergie & Andrew: Behind the Palace Doors (1992)
Roger Rees in Charles and Diana: Unhappily Ever After (1992)
David Threlfall in Diana: Her True Story (1993)
Ludger Pistor in Willi und die Windzors (1996)
Martin Turner in Prince William (2002)
Laurence Fox in Whatever Love Means (2005)
Paul Rhys and Martin Turner in the docudrama serial The Queen (2009)
Victor Garber in William & Catherine: A Royal Romance (2011)
Billy Jenkins (as a child in Season 1-2), Julian Baring (as an early teenager in Season 2), Josh O'Connor (Season 3-4), and Dominic West (Season 5) in The Crown (2016-present)
Harry Enfield in The Windsors (2016-2020)
Tim Pigott-Smith in King Charles III (2017)
Steve Coulter in Harry & Meghan: A Royal Romance (2018) and Harry & Meghan: Escaping the Palace (2021)
Charles Shaughnessy in Harry & Meghan: Becoming Royal (2019)
Dan Stevens in The Prince (2021)

Stage
Actors who have portrayed Charles in notable stage productions include:
Marc Sinden in Chorus Girls (1981) and Her Royal Highness..? (1981)
Tim Pigott-Smith in King Charles III (2014)
Roe Hartrampf in Diana (2019/2021)
Harry Enfield in The Windsors: Endgame (2021)

Music
Songs about Charles include:
"Buckingham Blues" by "Weird Al" Yankovic (1983)
"Prince Charles" by Christine Lavin (1986)

References

 
Charles 3